Bare literally means fully or partially naked, 
or figuratively used it means minimal.

Bare may also refer to:

People 
 Bare (surname)
 Jader Volnei Spindler (born 1982), Brazilian football player nicknamed "Bare"

Places 
 Bare Island (disambiguation)

Bosnia and Herzegovina 
 Bare, Busovača
 Bare (Hadžići)
 Bare (Jajce)
 Bare (Konjic)
 Bare (Posušje)
 Bare (Rudo), in Rudo
 Bare, Visoko, in Visoko, Bosnia and Herzegovina
 Bare cemetery, in Sarajevo

Cameroon 
 Baré, Cameroon

Ethiopia 
 Bare (woreda)

Kosovo 
 Bare, Kosovo, a village in Mitrovica district

Iran 
 Bare, East Azerbaijan
 Bare, West Azerbaijan

Italy 
 Bàre

Montenegro 
 Bare, Kolašin
 Bare, Šavnik

Romania 
 Báré, the Hungarian name for Bărăi village, Căianu Commune, Cluj County, Romania

Serbia 
 Bare, Knić
 Bare, Kraljevo
 Bare, Požarevac
 Bare, Prijepolje
 Bare, Rekovac
 Bare, Sjenica

United Kingdom 
 Bare, Morecambe, Lancashire, England

United States 
 Bare Butte, a summit in Texas

Music 
 Bare (Annie Lennox album), 2003
 Bare (Barb Jungr album), 1999
 Bare (Wayne Hussey album), 2008
 Bare (EP), by Little Nobody
 Bare: A Pop Opera, a musical story of two gay high school students
 "Bare", a song by Anthrax from Stomp 442
 B.A.R.E in the Woods, a music festival held in Portarlington, County Laois, Ireland

Other uses 
 Bare (magazine), 1999-2001 UK women's lifestyle magazine
 Bare (film), a 2015 drama film
 Bare, a 1991 autobiography of singer George Michael, co-written by Tony Parsons

See also 
 Bear (disambiguation)
 Baer (disambiguation)